is a  railway station in the town of Mogami, Yamagata, Japan, operated by the East Japan Railway Company (JR East).

Lines
Semi-Onsen Station is served by the Rikuu East Line, and is located 75.0 rail kilometers from the terminus of the line at Kogota Station.

Station layout
The station has one side platform, serving a bidirectional single track. The platform was formerly an island platform connected to the station building by a level crossing, but there is no longer a track on one side of the platform. The station is unattended.

History
The station was absorbed into the JR East network upon the privatization of JNR on April 1, 1987. It was renamed to its present name on December 4, 1999.

Surrounding area
Semi Onsen
Semi Post Office
 
Oguni River - A tributary of the Mogami River

See also
List of railway stations in Japan

External links
 JR East Station information 

Railway stations in Yamagata Prefecture
Rikuu East Line
Railway stations in Japan opened in 1915
Mogami, Yamagata